Zak is the given name or nickname of:

 Zak Abel (born 1995), English singer/songwriter, musician, and Cadet national table tennis champion
 Zak Ansah (born 1994), English-born Ghanaian footballer
 Zak Bagans (born 1977), American paranormal investigator, actor and author, host of the television series Ghost Adventures
 Zak Boggs (born 1986), American soccer player
 Zak Brown (born 1971), American businessman and former racing driver
 Zachariah Zak Chappell (born 1996), English cricketer
 Zak Cummings (born 1984), American mixed martial artist
 Zakkari Zak Dempster (born 1987), Australian racing cyclist
 Zackary Zak DeOssie (born 1984), American National Football League player
 Isaac Fe'aunati (born 1973), former rugby union player from New Zealand
 Zak Hardaker (born 1991), English rugby league footballer
 Zak Hill (born 1981), American football coach
 Zak Ibsen (born 1972), American retired soccer player
 Zak Jones (born 1995), Australian rules footballer
 Zak Keasey (born 1982), American former National Football League player
 Zak Knutson (born 1974) American director, producer, writer and actor
 Zaqueu Zak Morioka (born 1978), Brazilian racecar driver
 Adam Zachary Zak Orth (born 1970), American actor 
 Zak Penn (born 1968), American screenwriter and director
 Zak Sally, bassist and comic artist
 Zak Smith (born 1976), also known as Zak Sabbath, American artist and adult film performer
 Zak Starkey (born 1965), English rock drummer, son of Ringo Starr
 Zak Surety (born 1991), English snooker player
 Zak Waters (born 1966), British editorial photographer
 Zak Whitbread (born 1984), American-born English footballer
 Zakeria Zak Yacoob (born 1948), a former justice of the Constitutional Court of South Africa

See also
Zack (personal name)
Zechariah (given name)
Zachary

Lists of people by nickname